São Jorge is a village of approximately 250 people located at the entrance of the Chapada dos Veadeiros National Park.  It is 220 kilometers north of Brasília and can be reached by highway GO-118, that passes through São João d'Aliança. It belongs to the city of Alto Paraíso de Goiás.

São Jorge was important until the 1950s because of the crystal mines.  At one time the settlement had as many as 3,000 inhabitants, most of them from the Northeast.  One of the most visited sites is the Bus Station Waterfall (Cachoeira da Rodoviária), named so because it was from this site that the bus left and arrived bringing the miners.   

Today São Jorge lives off the small number of tourists who visit the park.  There is a mixture of different life styles among the inhabitants:  artists, hippies, intellectuals, and simple rural people.

The village has a health clinic, two churches, a community center, a sports court, a primary school, several bars, camping sites, inns, and several restaurants.

Populated places in Goiás